Klinki can refer to:

Plants
The vernacular name of the conifer Araucaria hunsteinii

People
Igor Sergei Klinki